Plasma deep drilling technology is one of several different variants of recently explored new drilling technologies which would be able to substitute conventional, contact-based rotary systems.
These new technologies, including plasma deep drilling, water jet, hydrothermal spallation or laser, are matter of active research. Only a very small number of companies have embraced plasma-drilling method, e.g. GA Drilling, headquartered in Bratislava, Slovakia.

High-energetic electrical plasma

High-energetic electrical plasma is a technology currently being developed in deep drilling applications to address many issues related to drilling in water environment or in the production of boreholes with a wide range of diameters.

Physical principle of electrical plasma

An electric arc is an electrical breakdown of a gas that produces an ongoing plasma discharge, resulting from a current flowing through normally nonconductive media such as air or gas. An arc discharge is characterized by a lower voltage than a glow discharge, and relies on thermionic emission of electrons from the electrodes supporting the arc. The electric arc is influenced by factors such as: the gas flow, inner and outer magnetic fields, and construction elements of the chamber which confines the arc. The development of highly effective plasma torches to be used as a source of the thermal plasma demands a deep understanding of the wide spectrum of processes taking place in the discharge chamber.

Advantages of Plasma deep drilling technology

 Higher drilling energy efficiency
 Continuous drilling process without replacement of mechanical parts
 Constant casing diameter
 Effective transport of disintegrated rock

See also

GA Drilling
New drilling technologies
Drilling rig
List of plasma (physics) articles
Oil well
Research Centre for Deep Drilling

References

 Massachusetts Institute of Technology (2006) "The Future of Geothermal Energy"
 Celim Slovakia (2011) "Arc Discharge, Plasma Torch (different approaches)"
 Pierce, K.G., Livesay, B.J., Finger J.T. (1996) "Advanced Drilling System Study"

Drilling technology
Geothermal drilling
Geothermal energy
Mining engineering
Plasma physics